Huseklepp is a surname. Notable people with the surname include:

Erik Huseklepp (born 1984), Norwegian footballer 
Ingvald Huseklepp (born 1949), Norwegian footballer, father of Erik
Otto Huseklepp (1892–1964), Norwegian politician

Norwegian-language surnames